Filipe Melo may refer to:

 Filipe Melo (writer) (born 1977), Portuguese musician, film director and comic book writer
 Filipe Melo (footballer) (born 1989), Portuguese footballer 
 Filipe Melo (politician) (born 1981), Portuguese politician

See also
Felipe Melo